 

The Zoom H4n is a digital recording device manufactured by Zoom. It is the successor of the Zoom H4 recorder. Both models have two built-in condenser mics arranged in X/Y stereo position and two XLR microphone inputs that double as 1/4 inch phono jacks for musical instruments. Musical applications for the H4N include the ability to use the device as a multi-track (four-channel) recorder; the device also includes tools like a built-in tuner, metronome and effects processor for line-level instruments like guitars.

The H4n has a rubberized casing, a larger screen and buttons that differ from the H4. The H4n (with firmware version 1.01) was released in February 2009.  A firmware update to version 1.9 was released in October, 2015.

The recorder has become very popular as an audio add on to DSLR video cameras, as well as with podcasters.

In 2015, the Zoom H4n Pro, the successor to the H4n, was introduced. It features improved preamps and a new rubberized case design.

Gallery

See also 
 Zoom H2n
 Zoom H5
 Zoom H2 Handy Recorder

References

External links 

 
 Technical specification
 3rd party software website
 Zoom H4N and Drum Recordings (German)

Zoom Corporation
Digital audio recording
Articles containing video clips